Heidlersburg is an unincorporated community and census-designated place in Tyrone Township, Adams County, Pennsylvania, United States. As of the 2020 census, the population was 509.

Heidlersburg is located at the crossroads of Pennsylvania Route 234 and Old Harrisburg Road, the former U.S. Route 15. Route 15 now bypasses the town to the east, with access from an exit at Route 234.
  
Heidlersburg was formerly known as Starry Town. There is a volunteer fire company, Company 25. The two churches in Heidlersburg are Heidlersburg United Brethren in Christ Church and St. Mark's Lutheran Church.

Demographics

References

External links
Heidlersburg Fire Company

Unincorporated communities in Pennsylvania
Census-designated places in Adams County, Pennsylvania
Census-designated places in Pennsylvania
Unincorporated communities in Adams County, Pennsylvania